WSJD "Sounding Just Delightful", (100.5 FM, "True Oldies 100.5") is a radio station serving the Evansville, Indiana area with an oldies format. It broadcasts on FM frequency 100.5 MHz and is under self ownership. Majority of the programming is featured from Scott Shannon's "The True Oldies Channel". The station signed on in 1995.

Prior to 2008, it was airing a Hot AC format known as "Star 100.5"

References

External links

SJD
Oldies radio stations in the United States
Radio stations established in 1995
1995 establishments in Indiana